Pillsbury Lake is a lake located northwest of Sled Harbor, New York. Fish species present in the lake are brook trout, black bullhead, and white sucker. There is carry down access on the south shore. No motors are allowed on this lake.

References

Lakes of New York (state)
Lakes of Hamilton County, New York